A single-blade propeller may be used on aircraft to generate thrust. Normally propellers are multiblades but the simplicity of a single-blade propeller fits well on motorized gliders, because it permits the design of a smaller aperture of the glider fuselage for retraction of the powerplant. The counterbalanced teetering mono-blade propeller generates fewer vibrations than conventional multiblade configurations. Often, single blade propeller configurations are touted as having a much greater efficiency than multiblade propellers, but this is a falsehood outside the inertial losses in spinning a heavier propeller, and the minimal additional drag from added blades. Single bladed propellers are principally used to fulfill engineering requirements that fall outside the scope of efficiency.

Patents 
 US Patent 2742095 Mechanism for balancing single blade aircraft rotor
 US Patent 6619585 Helicopter single-blade rotor
 US Patent 5971322 - Propeller propulsion unit for aircraft in general

Sources
https://web.archive.org/web/20070418051732/http://www.glidingmagazine.com/FeatureArticle.asp?id=368
https://web.archive.org/web/20070202111444/http://www.alisport.com/eu/images/img_news/Volaresett04/VOLARE_SETT04.htm

See also
Samara (fruit) single blade-like seed which autorotates in Nature.

Propellers